Octet is a ballet made on New York City Ballet by Willam Christensen to Stravinsky's Octet for Wind Instruments (1922–23). The premiere took place December 2, 1958, at the City Center of Music and Drama.

Original cast  
   
Barbara Walczak
Edward Villella
Dido Sayers
William Weslow
 
Roberta Lubell
Robert Lindgren
Judith Green
Richard Rapp

Reviews 
NY Times by John Martin, December 3, 1958

New York City Ballet repertory
Ballets by Willam Christensen
Ballets to the music of Igor Stravinsky
1958 ballet premieres